Rosey Jones is an Australian actress. For her performance in the film Afraid to Dance Jones was nominated for the 1988 AFI Award for Best Actress in a Leading Role Other roles include the 1986 TV mini series Alice to Nowhere and on stage in the Australian premiere of Unsuitable for Adults at Downstairs at Belvoir Street.

References

External links
 
Biographical cuttings on Rosey Jones, actress, containing one or more cuttings from newspapers or journals at the National Library of Australia

Living people
Australian film actresses
Australian stage actresses
Australian television actresses
Year of birth missing (living people)